Damir Dokić (born 1950s) is the father and ex-coach of the former professional tennis player Jelena Dokic. He gained notoriety for being involved in various unpleasant and violent incidents.

Biography 
Dokić is a self-proclaimed veteran of the Croatian War of Independence, in which he fought on the side of the Serbs. He also manufactures plum and pear "Eagle Brandy".

At the 2001 Australian Open, after Jelena's first-round loss to Lindsay Davenport, Dokić claimed there were irregularities in the draw and he was banned from the tournament due to abusive behavior. He later said "I think the draw is fixed just for her". Prior to this, in 2000, he lobbed a piece of fish at a cafeteria worker at the Australian Open after complaining about paying $10 for a skimpy piece of fish. 

During the 2002 Australian Open, he was featured in a series of advertisements for Kia Motors, the title sponsor of the event, poking fun at his past misconduct. Kia defended the choice, citing 98 per cent recognition of him, and saying that he would not be too expensive.

In June 2009, after he threatened the Australian ambassador to Serbia, Clare Birgin with a hand grenade, Dokić was sentenced to 15 months in prison for causing public danger and for the illegal possession of weapons. Dokić appealed against the sentence but it was upheld in September 2009. Following a further appeal, the sentence was reduced to 12 months and Dokić was released from jail in April 2010.

See also 

 Srdjan Djokovic

References 

1950s births
Living people
Serbian tennis coaches
Year of birth missing (living people)
Military personnel of the Croatian War of Independence
Serbs of Croatia
People convicted of illegal possession of weapons